Harriet Tubman Square (formerly known as Washington Park) is a city square in Downtown Newark, New Jersey.
It is the northernmost of the three colonial era downtown parks in the city, along with Lincoln Park and Military Park. The triangular park is bounded by Broad Street, Washington Street, and Washington Place at the end of Halsey Street. It is home to several public monuments and is surrounded by historic civic and commercial buildings. In a ceremony on Juneteenth 2022, the city re-named the park in honor of Harriet Tubman.

District

Originally known as the North Common or the Upper Green, the park is a contributing property to the James Street Commons Historic District and is surrounded by notable landmarks. It forms the northern end of the city's central business district.

The North Reformed Church was built in 1857-59 without the use of ore, iron, or steel. The Ballantine House, a National Historic Landmark, was built by the brewer of Ballantine beer, John Ballantine, in 1885. It is part of the Newark Museum. The main Newark Public Library was built in 1903. Residential brownstones are found along James Street.

Among the office buildings located in the district are the American Insurance Company Building, One Washington Park, IDT Corporation, 550 Broad Street,  33 Washington Street, and the Cablevision Call Center. Several facilities of Rutgers-Newark and the headquarters of Audible are on the park.

Statues

Several commemorative statues and tablets are in the park:

Indian and the Puritan (1916), one of four public worksby sculptor Gutzon Borglum in Newark. 
George Washington (1912), an A J. Massey Rhind work, depicts the general taking leave from his troops at Rockingham.
A statue of Christopher Columbus was made in Rome by Giuseppe Ciochetti and presented to the city by Newark's Italians in 1927. It was removed by the city (with pedestal left in place) in June 2020 to prevent its possible toppling in a Black Lives Matter protest.  The plinth was removed in 2022. The statue was in a vacant city lot, as of October 2020.
A work by Karl Gerhardt of Seth Boyden, who was one of Newark's leading citizens, captain of industry in the 19th century, an inventor of patent leather and innovation for  train locomotives.
Shadow of a Face by Nina Cooke John is a memorial to Harriet Tubman installed in 2023. It replaced the monument to Columbus.

Wednesdays at Washington Park
Since 2009, a weekly green market and outdoor concert is held at the park from June to October.

Transportation
The Newark Light Rail Washington Park station lies along the Broad Street side of the park. Riverfront Stadium station is a block away. The Newark Broad Street Station, served by New Jersey Transit (NJT), is two blocks north. Numerous buses serve Newark and environs, including Newark Liberty International Airport.

See also
List of public art in Newark, New Jersey
Mulberry Commons
National Register of Historic Places listings in Essex County, New Jersey
List of tallest buildings in Newark
List of monuments dedicated to George Washington

References 

Parks in Essex County, New Jersey
Squares in Newark, New Jersey
Tourist attractions in Newark, New Jersey
National Register of Historic Places in Newark, New Jersey
Historic district contributing properties in Newark, New Jersey
Neighborhoods in Newark, New Jersey
New Jersey Register of Historic Places
Parks on the National Register of Historic Places in New Jersey
Memorials to Harriet Tubman